The .577 Snider cartridge was a British black powder metallic centre fire cartridge, which fired a ,  lead projectile, primarily used in the Snider–Enfield rifle.

Early .577 Snider cartridges were made from a composite design using paper and brass foil with a stamped metallic base and primer, much like the first generation of Martini-Henry cartridges. Later cartridges (after the design had been proved with the Martini-Henry cartridges) were made from drawn brass, much like modern small arms ammunition. The .577 Snider cartridge was eventually replaced in service by the .577/450 Martini–Henry cartridge in the 1870s. The .577 Snider cartridge is considered by most commentators to be obsolete, with large scale commercial production having ceased in the 1930s. 

New brass can be formed from a 24 gauge  hull and reloading dies are available from Lee. As of 2015, Kynamco Kynoch in the United Kingdom and Bertram in Australia are also producing ready-made brass.

See also
 .577 Nitro Express
 .577/450 Martini–Henry
 Table of handgun and rifle cartridges

References

 The Handloader's Manual of Cartridge Conversions, by John J. Donnelly, Stoeger Publishing, 1987, p. 686. .
 Cartridges of the World, 4th Edition, p. 218.

External links
 Britain's big .577 Snider

Military cartridges
Pistol and rifle cartridges
British firearm cartridges